Virkkunen is a surname. Notable people with the surname include:

 Henrik Virkkunen (1917–1963), Finnish organizational theorist and Professor of Accounting
 Janne Virkkunen (born 1948), Finnish journalist
 Paavo Virkkunen (1874–1959), Finnish politician
 Valtteri Virkkunen (born 1991), Finnish ice-hockey forward